The Coupe de France's results of the 1958–59 season. Le Havre AC won the final played on May 3 and May 18, 1959, beating FC Sochaux-Montbéliard.

Round of 16

Quarter-finals

Semi-finals

Final

References

French federation

1958–59 domestic association football cups
Coupe
1958-59